Four ships of the Royal Navy have borne the name HMS Cressy, after the Battle of Crécy.

 was a 74-gun third rate launched in 1810 and broken up in 1832.
 was an 80-gun screw propelled third rate launched in 1853 and sold in 1867.
 was a  armoured cruiser launched in 1899 and sunk by a U-boat in 1914.
HMS Cressy was the name given to the 46-gun fifth rate  between 1941 and 1959 while she was serving as a drill ship for the Royal Naval Reserve. She was handed over for preservation in 1968.

Royal Navy ship names